Mutha's Day Out was an American rock band formed in November 1991 from the town of Batesville, Arkansas. The band consisted of: Mikal Moore (vocals), Brice Stephens (vocals), Chuck Schaaf (guitar), Jeff Morgan (bass), and Rodney Moffitt (drums). They released one album, My Soul is Wet, in 1993 for Chrysalis Records before breaking up.

Biography

Early days (1991-1992)
Influenced by the Beastie Boys, Mikal Moore (born Michael Morehead) and Randy Cross conceived Mutha's Day Out to “get chicks.” The band initially consisted of three vocalists (Mikal, Randy, and Brice Stephens). The name was thought up by Brice and came from a daycare center in Batesville that kids could go to for pre-school in Methodist churches. Jeff Morgan had just been kicked out of a band he and Chuck Schaaf were in when Mikal asked him to be in a band that would sound like "Faith No More, Beastie Boys, and Ozzy Osbourne." The band was rounded out by Rodney Moffitt, who played drums, and Lance Branstetter, who played guitar, with Chuck serving as his guitar tech. When the band first came together, Lance was 21 years old, Mikal was 20, Brice was 18, Chuck was 17, Rod was 17, and Jeff was 15.

In April 1992, the band traveled to Memphis, Tennessee in search of a cheap recording studio. They found the studio they were looking for belonging to recording engineers Doug Easley and Davis McCain. After producing Mutha's Day Out's first demo in studio, which consisted of 15 tracks, Doug booked the band to play in the Crossroads Music Festival that week. In the same performance, Mutha's Day Out's first, a representative from Chrysalis Records, Karen DuMont (who currently still works with Mikal), was present to see and sign another band. After seeing MDO's performance, she offered them a chance to go to the studio the next day, while receiving a record contract as well. Soon after the band signed  a songwriting agreement with leading independent music publisher, Hit & Run Music Publishing, being championed by Joey Gmerek and Dave Massey in the New York and London offices.

My Soul is Wet (1993)
They went to the studio to record their only album, My Soul is Wet. Randy Cross left the band the day after they got the record label and Lance was kicked out a week afterwards; the band replaced Lance with Chuck. Halfway through the production of the album, Greenforth Pham, a Vietnamese boy who was a close friend of Mikal and Brice's, committed suicide, and thus the album was dedicated in his memory ("Green"). The album was finished and then released on October 19, 1993. Chrysalis released four singles from the album: "Locked", "My Soul is Wet", "Green" and "What U See/We All Bleed Red". The first three singles were accompanied by music videos, with "Locked" being used on a segment of Beavis and Butthead in the episode "Crisis Line".

Tour (1994)
Mutha's Day Out toured the United States and Europe from late 1993 to late 1994. They were opening for such bands as Jackyl, King's X, Overkill, Sugartooth, and BulletBoys. Jeff, at one point during the tour, was in a leg brace having dislocated his knee the night before at a club gig in Birmingham, Alabama, but was still insistent on playing. During their tour in the United States, they stayed in cheap hotels to lower the cost of the record company's tour bill.

In the European leg of their tour, however, the band gained great notoriety, especially in France. There are many diehard fans to this day that are concentrated around Paris. Their only live record (EP) was recorded in the Virgin Megastore in Paris to a strong audience of loyal fans and contains 5 tracks. The band also performed at major rock festivals such as Winterthur in Switzerland.

Breakup (1994)
Mikal left the band in September 1994, but this had been discussed and dealt with already with Chrysalis before the album even came out. He was obligated to do the tour, however, and couldn't leave until that part of the deal was fulfilled. After Mikal left, the band decided to call it quits rather than continue forward with a new singer. The main reason the band broke up is that they were all going in different directions musically and it ripped apart the band. Had the band stayed together, Chuck and Jeff would have done most of the writing and gone in a much darker direction (with a sound similar to Kreator). In the aftermath, Mikal obtained the rights to Mutha's Day Out and still owns the rights to this day.

Mortal Kombat (1995)
Mutha's Day Out appeared in the 1995 movie Mortal Kombat during Scene 2 while Sonya searches for Kano at a nightclub in Hong Kong, amongst a large crowd moshing to them. They received a call on tour and were asked to take a few days to go to Hollywood and film their scene. Their song, "What U See", is featured on the soundtrack to Mortal Kombat. It is looped three times to form a four-minute song. The looped song also features a short cowbell intro and the removal of the foul language the song had originally contained, although some copies of the soundtrack do have the profanity included. The movie grossed over 100 million dollars and the soundtrack went platinum in 10 days.

Today
Mikal is married with three daughters and is the lead vocalist for the Christian rock band Circa 71. Brice owned a restaurant and coffee shop in Batesville called “The Pinto Coffee and Comida” with his wife; he has one child. Jeff lives in Little Rock and plays for two bands: bass guitar for Deadbird and drums for Rwake; he is married with a son and daughter. Chuck played in Rwake until 2002 and was one of two founding members of Deadbird along with his brother, Phillip; Chuck is married with two kids and works in accounting. Rod lives in Batesville and worked for the city mowing yards, and now works for a contractor hanging dry wall and is married. Lance died in June 2021 at the age of 51. Randy is currently a loan officer at a bank in Batesville and teaching banking and accounting classes at a local college.

Reunion
In January 2012, Mikal announced via his Facebook account that a Mutha's Day Out reunion was in the works, with Chuck and Jeff returning to the band, as well as adding a new drummer and removing the back-up singer. However, further details never emerged.

In November 2019, it was announced that a special Mutha's Day Out encore featuring Mikal, Brice, Chuck and Jeff would be taking place following Deadbird's performance at the Mutants of the Monster Festival in Little Rock, Arkansas in June 2020. This marks the first time all four have been on stage together in over 25 years. Due to the COVID-19 pandemic, the reunion event is postponed indefinitely.

Members

Former
 Mikal Moore - lead vocals (1991-1994)
 Brice Stephens - vocals (1991-1994)
 Randy Cross - vocals (1991-1992)
 Chuck Schaaf - guitar (1992-1994)
 Lance Branstetter - guitar (1991-1992)
 Jeff Morgan - bass guitar (1991-1994)
 Rodney Moffitt - drums (1991-1994)

Discography

My Soul is Wet (1993)
Produced by Eli Ball at The Warehouse Studio in Memphis, Tennessee
Released October 19, 1993

CD

References 

Heavy metal musical groups from Arkansas
American alternative metal musical groups
Musical groups established in 1991
Musical groups disestablished in 1994
Musical quintets
1991 establishments in Arkansas
Chrysalis Records artists